Julián Rodrigo Fernández (born March 22, 1995) is an Argentine footballer who plays as a midfielder for Newell's Old Boys in the Argentine Primera División.

Life and career
Fernández was born in Buenos Aires in 1995. His older brother Juan Manuel Fernández also became a footballer.

Fernández came through the youth system of the club he supported, All Boys, and made his senior debut on June 20, 2013, in the last 16 of the 2012–13 Copa Argentina, replacing Ivan Borghello after 81 minutes of a 3–1 win against Boca Juniors. His first Primera División appearance was also as a second-half substitute, in the final match of the 2012–13 season, a 4–0 defeat away to Arsenal de Sarandí. He played four times in the 2013–14 season, at the end of which All Boys were relegated, but appeared more frequently in the 2014 Primera B Nacional.

A proposed move to Primera club Olimpo de Bahía Blanca in January 2015 fell through when All Boys asked too high a fee. As Fernández established himself as a major player for All Boys, so the transfer rumours continued. In July 2015, a move to another Primera club, Independiente, seemed well on the way to completion. Still only 20 years old, Fernández captained All Boys in the 2016 season.

In June 2016, All Boys sold 80% of his economic rights to Olimpo. He had played 78 matches for the club in all competitions, and scored 3 goals. The player said the offer had come at the right time for him: although he loved All Boys and was grateful for their role in shaping him as a person as well as a player, he wanted to play at a higher level and his sale had brought much-needed finance into the club. He played little for Olimpo's first team12 appearances in the Primera, of which 7 startsbefore he moved on again.

Needing to replace Agustín Farías, their captain who was moving to Europe, Chilean Primera División club Palestino signed Fernández on a six-month loan in June 2017; the deal included options to extend the loan for a further year or to purchase.

References

1995 births
Living people
Footballers from Buenos Aires
Argentine footballers
Argentine expatriate footballers
Association football midfielders
All Boys footballers
Olimpo footballers
Club Deportivo Palestino footballers
Argentine Primera División players
Primera Nacional players
Chilean Primera División players
Argentine expatriate sportspeople in Chile
Expatriate footballers in Chile